Stuffed clams (or stuffies) are popular in New England, especially in Rhode Island, and consist of a breadcrumb and minced clam mixture that is baked on the half shell of a quahog hard shell clam. Other ingredients typically found in the basic breadcrumb mixture are: meat such as sausage, bacon or chouriço (Portuguese sausage), chili pepper, lemon juice, bell peppers, celery, onion, garlic, spices and herbs.  There are many different recipes for stuffed clams; many restaurants in New England have their own variety, as do many home cooks.

See also

 Stuffed mussels
 List of clam dishes
 List of seafood dishes
 List of stuffed dishes

References

New England cuisine
Clam dishes
Baked foods
Stuffed dishes